Katherine Wei-Sender (born 4 October 1930), born Yang Xiaoyan, is a Chinese American contract bridge player. She won major tournaments primarily as Kathie Wei.

Biography
Born in Beijing in 1930, she went to the United States in 1949. She was a graduate of the Shanghai University School of Nursing, and worked as a medical facility administrator until 1972.

After retirement, she became interested in bridge. She won the world Women's Pairs in 1978, the Women's Olympiad Teams in 1984 and the Venice Cup in 1987 and 2003. In 1987 Wei-Sender was elected an ACBL Honorary Member, and the Ambassador of Bridge for the World Bridge Federation.

She is from Nashville, Tennessee and New York City.

Wei-Sender was Inducted into the ACBL Hall of Fame in 1999.

Publications  

 Action for the Defense: when the enemy opens the bidding,  	Katherine Wei and Ron Andersen (New York: Monna Lisa Precision Corp., 1980), 245 pp., 
 "Defending Against Strong Club Openings", Katherine Wei, ed. Ron Andersen (Louisville, KY: Devyn Press, 1981), 9 pp. – Championship bridge series, no. 7, 
 Precision's One Club Complete, Katherine Wei and Judi Radin, ed. Ron Andersen (Monna Lisa, 1981), 169 pp., 
 Second Daughter: growing up in China, 1930–1949, Katherine Wei and Terry Quinn (Little, Brown, 1984), 243 pp. 

 On the Other Hand: a bridge from East to West, Martin Hoffman and Kathie Wei-Sender (Los Angeles: C&T Bridge Supplies, 1994), 135 pp.,  
 Precision Today: your guide to learning the system—or fine-tuning your precision partnership, David Berkowitz and Brent Manley, ed. Kathie Wei-Sender (Memphis, TN: DBM Publications, 2002), 219 pp., 
 The Wei of Good Bridge, Kathie Wei-Sender and Martin Hoffman with David Burn (London: B.T. Batsford, 2003), 143 pp.

References

External links 
  – with video interview
 
 Women Stars at the World Bridge Federation, with biographies (Wei-Sender [ biography ] is no longer one of the listed stars)
  (no bridge; see WorldCat)

1930 births
American contract bridge players
Contract bridge writers
Venice Cup players
Sportspeople from Beijing
Shanghai University alumni
Living people
Writers from Nashville, Tennessee
Writers from New York City
Chinese contract bridge players
Writers from Beijing
Chinese Civil War refugees